Owczary may refer to the following places in Poland:
Owczary, Lubin County in Lower Silesian Voivodeship (south-west Poland)
Owczary, Oława County in Lower Silesian Voivodeship (south-west Poland)
Owczary, Łódź Voivodeship (central Poland)
Owczary, Gorlice County in Lesser Poland Voivodeship (south Poland)
Owczary, Kraków County in Lesser Poland Voivodeship (south Poland)
Owczary, Świętokrzyskie Voivodeship (south-central Poland)
Owczary, Lubusz Voivodeship (west Poland)
Owczary, Bytów County in Pomeranian Voivodeship (north Poland)
Owczary, Słupsk County in Pomeranian Voivodeship (north Poland)
Owczary, West Pomeranian Voivodeship (north-west Poland)